General Abraham may refer to:

Erich Abraham (1895–1971), Nazi Germany Wehrmacht general
Lucien Abraham (1902–1960), Arkansas Army National Guard major general
Roman Abraham (1891–1976), Polish Army brigadier general 
William Abraham (British Army officer) (1897–1980), British Army major general